Christine Margaret Butler (née Smith; 14 December 1943 – 19 September 2017) was a British politician who served as Member of Parliament for Castle Point, representing the Labour Party, between 1997 and 2001.

Early life
She attended Nelson Grammar School (became Walton High School in 1972) on Oxford Road in Nelson, then Middlesex Polytechnic, where she gained a BA. She worked in the pharmaceutical industry then the NHS.

Political career
In 1993 she was elected to Essex County Council.

Parliamentary career
She was elected Labour Party Member of Parliament for Castle Point in Essex in 1997, but lost her seat in the 2001 election, to Robert Spink, the man she had defeated, by under 1,000 votes.

Personal life
Butler married Robert Butler in 1964 in Uxbridge, with whom she had three sons. She died in September 2017 at the age of 73 after suffering from dementia.

External links
 They Work For You
 Voting Record
 Electoral history
 Her contributions at Hansard

References

1943 births
2017 deaths
Alumni of Middlesex University
Female members of the Parliament of the United Kingdom for English constituencies
Labour Party (UK) MPs for English constituencies
Members of Essex County Council
People educated at Walton High School, Nelson
People from Nelson, Lancashire
UK MPs 1997–2001
20th-century British women politicians
21st-century British women politicians
20th-century English women
20th-century English people
21st-century English women
21st-century English people
Women councillors in England